Walburga Ehrengarde Helena, Lady Paget (née von Hohenthal; 3 May 1839 – 11 October 1929) was a German writer, occultist, and intimate friend of Queen Victoria.

Biography

Countess Walburga Ehrengarde Helena von Hohenthal was born in 1839 in Berlin, Germany. She was the daughter of Count Karl Friedrich Anton von Hohenthal and his second wife,  Countess Emilie Niedhart von Gneisenau. Before her marriage she was a lady-in-waiting to Victoria, Princess Royal.

In 1860, she married Sir Augustus Berkeley Paget (1823–1896), British ambassador in Copenhagen, and later British Ambassador in  Vienna, Portugal, Florence and Rome. After her husband's posting to Copenhagen, Lady Paget helped Queen Victoria to arrange the marriage of the Prince of Wales, afterwards Edward VII, to Princess Alexandra of Denmark. The Pagets had three children:

 Victor Frederick William Augustus Paget (1861–1927), a Lieutenant Colonel 
 Alberta Victoria Sarah Caroline Paget (1863–1944), married Robert Windsor-Clive, 1st Earl of Plymouth, GBE, CB, PC (1857–1923)
Sir Ralph Paget,  KCMG, CVO, PC  (1864–1940)

In 1867, her husband was posted to Florence, then the capital of the newly formed Italy. In 1870, when Rome became the capital, she arranged for the British embassy to be established at the Villa Torlonia. In 1884 she and her husband had to move to Vienna. In 1887, Lady Paget rented the Villa Caprini in Fiesole, Florence; and in 1893, when her husband retired to Britain, she bought the Torre di Bellosguardo south of the city. When her husband died in 1897 she kept Bellosguardo as her main residence, devoting her time to campaigning – with Vernon Lee, Augustus Hare and others – against the destruction of parts of old Florence by the Municipality, and developing her house and gardens. Queen Victoria visited her in 1893.

In 1913, amid rumors of war, Lady Paget returned to Britain. Bellosguardo was bought by an Austrian, baroness Marion von Hornstein. In 1929, at the age of ninety, she died of burns after falling asleep by the fire at Unlawater House, Newnham on Severn and was buried next to her husband at Tardebigge, Worcestershire.

Vegetarianism

Lady Paget was a vegetarian. She authored the article "Vegetable Diet" in Nineteenth Century magazine in 1892. It was republished by The Popular Science Monthly in 1893. She explained her reasons as follows: I strongly condemn the practice, and do not eat flesh-food myself. Two or three years ago I had occasion to read up certain papers about the transport of cattle and slaughter-houses, and as I read the irresistible conviction came upon me that I must choose between giving up the eating of animal food and my peace of mind. These considerations were not the only ones that moved me. I do not think that anyone has a right to indulge in tastes which oblige others to follow a brutalizing and degrading occupation. When you call a man a butcher, it signifies that he is fond of bloodshed. Butchers often become murderers, and I have known cases where butchers have actually been hired to murder persons whom they did not even know... I was almost fully persuaded that the vegetable diet was the most healthful in every way, and my experience has proved it to be so.

However, Paget did consume eggs and fish so she was not a strict vegetarian. She also disagreed with the temperance movement as she took a glass of wine at dinner. In regard to her diet, Paget commented that "I have experienced a delightful sense of repose and freedom, a kind of superior elevation above things material." Paget was vice-president of the London Vegetarian Society.

Selected publications
Her published works, mostly memoirs of her life and experiences, include:

 Vegetable Diet (1892, republished in 1893)
 Colloquies with an Unseen Friend (1907)
 Embassies of Other Days (1923)
 In My Tower (1924)
 The Linings of Life (1929)

Notes

References

Lady Paget (Food, Home and Garden, 1897)
Packard, Jerrold M. Victoria's Daughters (St Martin's Griffin, New York, 1998) 
Time Magazine (October 21, 1929).

1839 births
1929 deaths
Accidental deaths in England
Deaths from fire
German countesses
German diarists
German emigrants to England
German ladies-in-waiting
German vegetarianism activists
German women writers
Walburga
People associated with the Vegetarian Society
Victorian women writers
Wives of knights
Women diarists
Writers from Berlin